Estel may refer to:

People
Estel Wood "Ed" Kelley, founder of Steak 'n Shake restaurant chain
Estel Tessmer, football and basketball player
Estel Crabtree, baseballer
Other
Estel (middle earth name), a name in J.R.R. Tolkien's Middle-earth fantasy universe
Star in Catalan
Estel, Dutch-German steel company